The National Legitimist (People's) Party (NLN) was a Catholic political party in Hungary during the 1930s.

History
The party first contested national elections in 1935, winning a single seat in the parliamentary elections that year. In 1937 they merged with the Christian Economic and Social Party and the Christian Opposition to form the United Christian Party.

References

Defunct political parties in Hungary
Monarchism in Hungary
Political parties established in 1933
Political parties disestablished in 1937
Catholic political parties
Christian political parties in Hungary